Birnam is a village in Perth and Kinross, Scotland. The village originated from the Victorian era with the coming of the railway in 1856, although the place and name is well known because William Shakespeare mentioned Birnam Wood in Macbeth:

Prior to the construction of the railway, the only substantial building on the site of the present village was the church of Little Dunkeld parish, which still stands in its ancient position within a graveyard within the village. Dunkeld, to whose monastery Kenneth MacAlpin, the first King of Scotland, moved the bones of St. Columba around the middle of the ninth century, and which is notable for its cathedral, lies on the opposite bank of the river.

Transport

In 1977, Birnam, along with neighbouring Dunkeld and Little Dunkeld, was bypassed by A9. The village is now approximately one hour from Glasgow and Edinburgh, and two hours from Inverness, by car. There are regular bus and coach services to Birnam and Dunkeld along the A9, with long-distance coaches operated by Scottish Citylink. There is access by rail at Dunkeld & Birnam railway station on the Highland Main Line route between Perth and Inverness. Most services on the route extend to either Edinburgh Waverley or Glasgow Queen Street; on Sundays only a southbound train operated by the East Coast Main Line operator extends to London King's Cross via Edinburgh, although there is no corresponding northbound service from London. A daily (except Saturday) London service is offered by the overnight Caledonian Sleeper trains to and from London Euston.

Notable people

John Everett Millais, who painted many local landscapes, and Beatrix Potter, with her family, often visited Birnam. Potter drafted her first book, The Tale of Peter Rabbit, at Eastwood House whilst writing a story and picture letter to child friend Noel Moore on 4 September 1893. There is an exhibition and garden dedicated to Potter and her characters in Birnam.

Dr George Smyttan FRSE HEIC (1789-1863) was born and raised in Dunkeld, and retained links to Birnam all his life.

Attractions 
There is an ancient tree, the Birnam Oak, standing a few hundred metres from the centre of Birnam on Murthly Estate. Traditionally, it was known as "The Hangman's Tree". The Birnam Oak is believed to be the only remaining tree from the Birnam Wood of Macbeth.

In addition to The Beatrix Potter Exhibition and Garden, Birnam also has a community-run arts and performance centre and library, Birnam Arts and Conference Centre.

The Birnam Highland Games is the location of the World Haggis Eating Championships.

Gallery

References

External links

 Dunkeld and Birnam Tourist Association
 Dunkeld & Birnam at VisitScotland Perthshire

Villages in Perth and Kinross